

2003

External links

List of 2003 box office number-one films in Mexico

References

2003
Films
Mexican